Physics is an open access online publication containing commentaries on the best of the peer-reviewed research published in the journals of the American Physical Society. The editor-in-chief of Physics is Matteo Rini. It highlights papers in Physical Review Letters and the Physical Review family of journals.  The magazine was established in 2008.

Features
Physics contains three types of commentaries on research papers: journalistic articles ("Focus"), in depth pieces written by active researchers ("Viewpoints"), and short summaries of a research paper ("Synopsis") written by editorial staff. Readers get free access to the underlying research papers on which the commentaries are based.

References

External links
 

Online magazines published in the United States
American Physical Society publications
Science and technology magazines published in the United States
English-language magazines
Magazines established in 2008
Magazines published in New York (state)
Open access publications
Physics magazines